Bistriopelma matuskai is a species of tarantula, in the theraphosinae subfamily, which is (as of February 2016) only known from Peru.

Etymology
Bistriopelma matuskai 's specific name is in honour of Ondřej Matuška, the author's brother-in-law, who helped in field research.

Characteristics
B. matuskai has no fovea, and only has fine grains on the spermathecae. It has only an undeveloped basal tubercle.

References

Theraphosidae
Spiders of South America
Fauna of Peru
Endemic fauna of Peru
Spiders described in 2015